Orekhov (masculine) or Orekhova (feminine) is a Russian surname derived from the word орех (orekh, meaning "nut"). Notable people with the surname include:
Aleksandr Orekhov (footballer, born 1983), Russian football player
Aleksandr Orekhov (footballer, born 2002), Russian football player
Artyom Orekhov (footballer, born 1990), Russian football player
Vitaly Orekhov (born 1991), Russian writer
Lev Orekhov (1913-1992) Russian painter
Lyubov Orechova, Soviet sprint canoer
Sergei Orekhov (1935-1998), Soviet/Russian classic guitarist

Russian-language surnames

ru:Орехов